Bequia ( or ) is the second-largest island in the Grenadines at . Bequia means "island of the clouds" in the ancient Arawak. The island's name was also 'Becouya' as part of the Grenadines.

Bequia has a history of whaling which was introduced by the Yankee whalers in the 19th century. Its people are only allowed to catch up to four humpback whales per year using traditional hunting methods. The limit is rarely met, with no catch some years.

Geography

The native population are primarily a mixture of people of African, Scottish and Kalinago descent. A substantial number of white Barbadians also settled the Mount Pleasant area of Bequia in the 1860s. Many of their descendants still inhabit the area. Other highly populated areas include the island capital, Port Elizabeth, which hosts the ferry terminal and Paget Farm, which hosts the airport. There are also villages at Lower Bay, La Pompe, Hamilton and Belmont. Other prominent areas of Bequia include Spring, the site of a former coconut plantation and home to agricultural animals, Industry Bay and Park Bay, where the Old Hegg Turtle Sanctuary is located.

The island's hills are much lower than the peaks of St. Vincent,  to the north, so they do not receive as many rain showers.

Princess Margaret, who had a home on nearby Mustique, visited Bequia in the 1950s and had a beach renamed in her honour.
Princess Margaret Beach is next to Port Elizabeth and is situated inside Admiralty Bay on the west coast.
The beach was originally known as Tony Gibbons, and continues to be known by that name locally, though the origin of this name is uncertain.
Also on the west coast are the island's main port and a large natural harbour.

Tourism

Bequia is popular among cruising yachts, expats and tourists. One of the busiest times of the year is the annual Easter Regatta and Music Fest.

Two scuba diving stores run dive trips to 28 identified dive sites around Bequia. There are several wrecks and shallow caves accessible to advanced divers. It is not unusual to see Hawksbill turtles, lobsters, moray eels and many kinds of fish when diving around Bequia.

History

As a result of the Treaty of Utrecht, which brought an end to the War of Spanish Succession and established peace between the Spanish and British Empires, Great Britain obtained the lucrative monopoly over the Asiento slave trade. Runaway and shipwrecked slaves inhabited the island of St. Vincent in the 17th century. According to an early account of the French West Indies, which considered Bequia as part of Grenada, Bequia was too inaccessible to colonize and Kalinago and Arawaks used the island for fishing and farming. A few Portuguese and Dutch slave ships en route to Sint Eustatius from West Africa reportedly shipwrecked on the Grenadine reefs.

Bequia was under French control in the 18th century and during the Seven Years' War with England, the island was used by the fleets of their Spanish and Dutch allies to take on supplies, while British ships were banned. The 1763 Treaty of Paris produced a significant re-alignment in the map of the Caribbean; St. Vincent and the Grenadine islands, including Grenada, were given to the British in exchange for Guadeloupe, Martinique and St. Lucia. The name Petit Martinique comes from this era, as does Petit Saint Vincent. In 1779 the French seized the island, despite the treaty, but were forced to relinquish control to Britain again soon after.

The early 18th century saw the development of a sugar industry and the production of related products including molasses and rum. Other major produce included coffee, indigo and arrowroot. At one point in time, the islands of St. Vincent and the Grenadines were the single largest producer of arrowroot starch in the world. Currently, Hairoun and Vincy strong rum are major export products primarily to the European Union.

Under a programme instituted by Great Britain to give land to indigent settlers, James Hamilton, father of Alexander Hamilton, moved from St. Croix to Bequia in 1774 where he remained until 1790. The land granted to Hamilton lies along the shore of Southeast Bay. Despite his son's frequent gifts of money and entreaties to immigrate or at least visit him, neither visited the other.

Some historians believe that the famous pirate Edward Teach had his base in Bequia. The opening shot of the movie Blackbeard, Pirate of the Caribbean, made by the BBC, displays a replica of his first ship off the coast of Bequia in the St. Vincent passage. According to local legend, Saint Vincent and the Grenadines was not only Teach's base, but also the place from which Sir Francis Drake planned his attacks on the Spanish admiralty in Don Blas de Lezo's Cartagena. Indeed, it is thought that Henry Morgan may also have anchored in Admiralty Bay, as it was then the safest natural harbour in the Eastern Caribbean during hurricane season. Bequia was used as a repair facility for ships. Beside Nelson's Dockyard on Antigua, and the Carlyle in Bridgetown, Barbados, there were no other drydocks or shipyards in the area. Wooden shipbuilding and ship-repair on Bequia was possible due to the presence of cedar trees on the island and a sufficiently deep and sheltered harbour.

Whaling

Bequia is one of the few places in the world where limited whaling is still allowed. The International Whaling Commission (IWC) classifies the island's hunt under the regulations concerning aboriginal whaling. Natives of Bequia are allowed to catch up to four humpback whales per year using only traditional hunting methods of hand-thrown harpoons in small, open sailboats, but these methods are regularly abused by using speedboats to chase whales and harpoon guns for the kill. The limit is rarely met, with no catch some years. Bequia has a long tradition of whaling as well as the building of whaling boats.

In the 2012 meeting of the IWC, the delegates renewed the annual quota of whales for all three groups who submitted joint bids: Alaskan Inupiat, Russian indigenous people in Chukotka in eastern Siberia, and St Vincent and the Grenadines, despite protestations of delegates from Dominican Republic, Ecuador, Chile, and Costa Rica. Dominican Republic delegate Peter Sanchez said the St Vincent and the Grenadines hunt was "artisanal whaling out of control," and that the hunters have "repeatedly broken the rules—hunting for young ones and pregnant females." Other delegates pointed out that St. Vincent and the Grenadines' bid "should not qualify under ASW [Aboriginal Subsistence Whaling] rules because the Bequians, the group that maintains the hunt, are not truly indigenous." Monaco delegate Frederic Briand argued that whaling "started by a settler's family as recently as 1875 does not qualify as 'aboriginal'." Louise Mitchell Joseph, speaking on behalf of the Eastern Caribbean Coalition of Environmental Awareness stated that there was no documented history of whaling in the islands, and that "there have been many archaeological excavations conducted, and there was no evidence found whatsoever of whale hunting by aboriginal peoples. Neither whale remains nor weapons that could have been used to kill such a large mammals were ever found; neither are any images of whales inscribed on our petroglyphs."

There is a small whaling museum on the island chronicling local whaling's history. A feature of the Port Elizabeth waterfront is the Whaleboner Bar & Restaurant. This bar has an entrance onto the beach consisting of an arch of two whale ribs, as well as whale vertebrae mounted on the bar seats and a whale rib running the length of the bar.

Transportation

Air

Constructed in 1992, the James F. Mitchell International Airport for small planes is located near Paget Farm.

Sea

Regularly scheduled ferries run from the main island of Saint Vincent. Three ferries operate between the capital, Kingstown, and the local port of Port Elizabeth. The other islands in the Grenadines can be reached by the last operational schooner in the Caribbean, the antique original Bequia-built SS Friendship Rose, as well as other charter/tour boats that are widely available and based in Port Elizabeth, islands for matches. The ferry offers daytime as well as overnight charters, and onboard picnics are locally renowned. This has resulted in significant increases in mostly domestic tourism.

The ferry pier is located 45 minutes' drive from Argyle International Airport and is served by two companies, Bequia Express and Admiralty Transport. The approximate capacity of the ship is 28 cars or 10 to 20 containers and is licensed for 400 passengers. The Admiral II is a similarly sized vessel with a capacity for 250 passengers. Travellers on the Admiral II have a choice between air-conditioned indoor seating or covered outdoor seating. The passage between Kingstown and Port Elizabeth is a  trip taking approximately one hour.

Pedestrians such as hitchhikers and backpackers have the option of the Grenadines mail boat which travels to Port Elizabeth at irregular intervals. The mail boat calls at Canouan, Mayreau and Union islands although boarding at Mayreau can be difficult, as the vessel remains in deeper waters, with passengers being required to embark and leave through the use of smaller craft, which land on the nearby beach.

Communications
The island has a variety of communication systems including standard telephone and fax lines, a mobile network, and internet access. The old telex system still operates. Bequia has its own heavy-duty, long-range shortwave radio antenna. Many inhabitants use the marine VHF radio system on channel 68 for local communication.

Publications
Considering the size of the island, Bequia has a large publications industry. Various publishers, editors, and writers work on the island, as do painters and graphic designers.

Notable people
 Sydney Gun-Munro, First Governor General of Saint Vincent and the Grenadines
 Sanford Meisner, American actor and acting teacher.

See also
Moonhole – a private community on Bequia

References
Notes

Bibliography
 
 

Islands of Saint Vincent and the Grenadines